The 1978 Bergen County Classic was a women's singles tennis tournament played on outdoor hard courts at the Ramapo College in Mahwah, New Jersey in the United States. The event was part of the AA category of the 1978 Colgate Series. It was the inaugural edition of the tournament and was held from 21 September through 26 September 1978. First-seeded Virginia Wade won the singles title and earned $14,000 first-prize money.

Finals

Singles
 Virginia Wade defeated  Kerry Reid 1–6, 6–1, 6–4
It was Wade's 2nd title of the year and the 54th of her career.

Doubles
 Ilana Kloss /  Marise Kruger defeated  Barbara Potter /  Pam Whytcross 6–3, 6–1

Prize money

Notes

References

External links
 International Tennis Federation (ITF) tournament details
  Women's Tennis Association (WTA) tournament details

Bergen County Classic
WTA New Jersey
Bergen County Classic
Mahwah, New Jersey
1978 in American tennis